Halle Brothers Co., commonly referred to as Halle's, was a department store chain based in Cleveland, Ohio. During most of its 91-year history, Halle's focused on higher-end merchandise which it combined with personal service.  The company was the first major department store in Cleveland to open a suburban branch store.

History
The Halle Brothers Co. (1891–1982) was considered the leading department store company in Cleveland, Ohio. Founded on 7 February 1891, by brothers Samuel Horatio Halle and Salmon Portland Chase Halle, the very first store was located at 221 Superior Avenue near the city's Public Square where the brothers had bought out a hat and furrier shop owned by T.S. Paddock. The firm was officially incorporated in 1902 as the Halle Bros. Co. Years later, they moved to Euclid Avenue and East 4th Street and added ready-to-wear clothing to the merchandise mix.

Expansion
After growing and moving several times, the company eventually built its main store at 1228 Euclid Avenue by 1910. Standing at 195 feet, it was the tallest department store ever constructed in the city. It was designed by New York architect Henry Bacon and was called elegant yet refined in its detailing of  its white terra cotta facade.

By 1927, their new $5 million Huron-Prospect Building was opened, creating an emporium in what is now known as the city's Theater District.

Halle's was well regarded as a high-end department store, receiving praise for opening stores beyond the usual shopping district of Public Square in downtown Cleveland. As of 1927, Halle's selling region included western New York, Pennsylvania, Northeast Ohio, and Indiana.

Halle's devotion to personalized service was well known, and each new employee received the company's pledge to service upon their hiring:

When the flagship store expanded in 1927, TIME praised the business for helping to turn the city of Cleveland into a more metropolitan city and compared Halle's to Lord & Taylor, B. Altman & Co., R.H. Stearns, Marshall Field & Co., Bullock's, and Maison Blanche.

Although the company sustained losses during the Great Depression, business grew again after World War II as Halle's began developing suburban branches starting in 1948 under the leadership of Walter Murphy Halle, while completing a $10 million modernization at Playhouse Square that included a new service building on Prospect Avenue and the West Wing addition to its original building in 1949. Over time, the store came to be enjoyed by the city's carriage trade society, especially during the Christmas season when the flagship store had its very own popular version of Santa Claus, a fictional elf named Mr. Jingeling, who could be found, as the TV and radio jingle reminded kids, "on Halle's seventh floor" serving as Santa's "Keeper Of The Keys." Mr. Jingleing was created in 1956 as a way to promote the department store's toys. It was originally a one-time promotion in 1956, but it instantly became popular and was turned into an annual tradition. The first Mr. Jingeling was Thomas V. Moviel, a Cleveland Police Officer.

In 2014, the K & D Group of Willoughby, Ohio entered into an agreement to purchase the Halle Building and turn it into high end apartments. The building was sold to the group for 20 million dollars and was renovated into luxury apartments.

Slow decline
While the company outlasted many other department and specialty stores in Cleveland, the 1960s brought hard times to the family business. With the closing of Sterling-Lindner Co. and Bonwit Teller, both located across from the main Halle's store in downtown, and the decline of Cleveland's Playhouse Square theaters, downtown shopping shifted to Cleveland's Public Square where rivals Higbee's and The May Company operated stores with easy access to Cleveland's Rapid Transit system.  The company attempted to counter this competitive disadvantage by leasing, in 1956, a number of buses from the Cleveland Transit System for the purpose of providing a free shuttle service from Public Square to Playhouse Square, a move initially seen as an interim measure pending completion of a proposed subway line under Euclid Avenue (a project for which voters had approved public financing in 1953).  When the planned subway failed to materialize (then-County Engineer Albert S. Porter refused to go forward with the project believing that the future of local transportation was linked to the freeway), Halle's was forced to continue the shuttle service.

Without the draw of other stores, and rising crime on Cleveland's near east side, it became more difficult for suburban shoppers to justify a trip to the flagship Halle's store. In early 1969, Halle's followed suit from The May Company in 1966, issuing their own personal pink charge card with its new modern block print style logo for its customers, and discontinuing use of the Charge-A-Plate Associates shared metal notched charge card. Higbee's did the same in August, 1969, issuing their own beige charge card with their new logo,thus ending all local department stores using Charge-A-Plate Associates cards.

Suffering from an overbuilt flagship, the abandonment of Downtown Cleveland and over-expansion into the outlying areas, the company was sold to Marshall Field's in 1970, under which it deteriorated, falling behind local rivals Higbee's and May Company.  Attempts to lure less upscale patrons with mid-priced goods failed, forcing the 1974 resignation of then-President/CEO Chisholm Halle - Walter's son and the grandson of Samuel H. Halle who had died in 1954. In 1969, Under Chisolm Halle, The Halle Bros. Co. retired their traditional Old English script in favor of a more "modern" look with simple block lettering and shortened their name on printed material to just "Halle's".  This new logo did not resonate well with Cleveland shoppers who were mourning the loss of Halle's former logo. In late 1969, Halle's reverted to the Old English logo but kept all printed material to simply "Halle's". In 1971, after Marshall Field's purchase of the chain, they did attempt to modernize Halle's look, investing in a brand make-over campaign over the course of the year, including retiring Halle's traditional Old English script logo and re-instituting a new logo which matched that of Marshall Field's current logo.

Demise

In November 1981, Field's sold Halle's (now numbering 15 stores in Ohio and Pennsylvania) to Associated Investors Corporation, led by Columbus, Ohio businessman Jerome Schottenstein, whose primary holdings included the Value City discount store chain.  At first, the sale seemed to hold promise for Halle's.  Schottenstein attempted to allay community fears by placing full page newspaper ads in which he promised to see to the continuation of the chain's traditions.

However, Associated Investors subsequently liquidated the company in 1982 with all the stores either sold or closed despite attempts to operate them as a smaller suburban six-unit operation.  The company planned a location at Randall Park Mall in North Randall, Ohio in the 1970s, but later canceled the idea.  The Halle's space remained empty until construction of a multiscreen cineplex in the late 1990s.

Columbus locations

The Union Co., a division of Manhattan Industries, was an upscale department store with six locations in and around the Columbus, Ohio region. Manhattan sold the chain to Marshall Field & Co. of Chicago in 1980 who paid $8 million and rebranded the chain to Halle's.

In popular culture
 Halle's former flagship store at Playhouse Square Center was redeveloped as offices by Forest City Enterprises with space for retail shops on the street level and a food court in the former Downstairs Store. During the late 1990s, the building was also used as the main location of the fictional Winfred-Louder store in "The Drew Carey Show" on ABC.
 Actress Halle Berry, who was born in Cleveland, was named after the famed department store.
 The Halle Trophy Race for women aviators was named after the department store, which was the inaugural sponsor of the race.

See also
List of defunct department stores of the United States

References

External links
Halle's Severance Center Mall Entrance 

Defunct department stores based in Cleveland
Clothing retailers of the United States
Skyscraper office buildings in Cleveland
Department stores on the National Register of Historic Places
Commercial buildings on the National Register of Historic Places in Ohio
National Register of Historic Places in Cleveland, Ohio
Defunct companies based in Cleveland
Retail companies established in 1891
Retail companies disestablished in 1982